The Apertura 2012 season (officially known as Torneo Apertura 2012 or also known as the Copa Capri for sponsoring reasons) was the 29th edition of El Salvador's Primera División since its establishment of an Apertura and Clausura format. C.D. Águila headed into this tournament as the defending champions. The season began on 14 July 2012 and concluded in the end of the year. Like previous years, the league consisted of 10 teams, each playing a home and away game against the other clubs for a total of 18 games, respectively. The top four teams by the end of the regular season took part in the playoffs.

Team information
A total of 10 teams will contest the league, including 9 sides from Apertura 2011 and Clausura 2012 and one promoted from the 2011–12 Segunda División.

Vista Hermosa were relegated to 2012–13 Segunda División the previous season.

The relegated team were replaced by 2011–12 Segunda División Playoffs promotion. Santa Tecla won the Clausura 2012 title, this led to take part of the promotion playoffs alone the Apertura 2011 champions side Titán. Santa Tecla won the playoffs by the score of 2–1 .

Promotion and relegation
Promoted from Segunda División de Fútbol Salvadoreño as of June 6, 2012.
 Champions: Santa Tecla F.C.
Relegated to Segunda División de Fútbol Salvadoreño as of June 6, 2012.
 Last Place: Vista Hermosa

Stadia and locations

Personnel and sponsoring

Managerial changes

Before the start of the season

During the regular season

League table

Results

Playoffs

Semi-finals

First leg

Second leg

Isidro Metapán won 5-3 on aggregate.

1-1 on aggregate. Alianza advanced due it to better position on the table.

Final

Player statistics

Top scorers

 Updated to games played on 25 November 2012. 
 Post-season goals are not included, only regular season goals.

Assists table

Goalkeepers

Bookings

Hat-tricks

Individual awards

Season statistics

Scoring
 First goal of the season:  William Bonilla for Santa Tecla against Isidro Metapán, 2 minutes (14 July 2012)
 Fastest goal in a match: 25 seconds –  Hugo Montes for Atlético Marte against Once Municipal (7 November 2012)
 Goal scored at the latest point in a match: 90+4,  Benji Villalobos for Águila against Isidro Metapán (15 September 2012)
 First penalty Kick of the season:  Carlos Escudero for Santa Tecla against Isidro Metapán, 74 minutes (14 July 2012)
 Widest winning margin: 6 goals
 Alianza 7–1 Santa Tecla (22 July 2012)
 First hat-trick of the season: Anel Canales for Luis Ángel Firpo against Once Municipal (12 November 2012)
 First own goal of the season: Juan Granados (Independiente) fot FAS (21 October 2012)
 Most goals by one team in a match: 7 Goals
 Alianza 7–1 Santa Tecla (22 July 2012)
 Most goals in one half by one team: 5 Goals
 Alianza 7–1 Santa Tecla (22 July 2012)
 Most goals scored by losing team: 3 Goals
 Juventud Independiente 4–3 Atlético Marte (5 August 2012)
 Most goals by one player in a single match: 3 Goals
  Anel Canales for Luis Ángel Firpo against Once Municipal (12 November 2012)

Discipline
 First yellow card of the season:  Fabricio Alfaro for Santa Tecla against Isidro Metapán, 37 minutes (14 July 2012)
 First red card of the season:  José Alvarado for Isidro Metapán against Santa Tecla, 72 minutes (14 July 2012)
 Card given at latest point in a game:Yellow  Dennis Alas for Luis Ángel Firpo against Isidro Metapán, 90+4 minutes (4 August 2012)

List of foreign players in the league
This is a list of foreign players in Apertura 2012. The following players:
 have played at least one apertura game for the respective club.
 have not been capped for the El Salvador national football team on any level, independently from the birthplace

A new rule was introduced a few season ago, that clubs can only have three foreign players per club and can only add a new player if there is an injury or player/s is released.

C.D. Águila
  Yaikel Pérez
  Ricardo de Lima

Alianza F.C.
  Sean Fraser
  Diego Passarelli
  Christian Vaquero

Atlético Marte
  Daniel Ruiz
  Garrick Gordon
  Cristian Gil Mosquera

Juventud Independiente
  Juan Carlos Reyes
  Maximiliano Alexis Villega
  Jeremy Araya

C.D. FAS
  Alejandro Bentos
  Emerson Reis Luiz
  Mario Alberto Abadía

 (player released mid season)

C.D. Luis Ángel Firpo
  Anel Canales
  Luis Torres
  James Owusu-Ansah

A.D. Isidro Metapán
  Ernesto Aquino
  Jorge Ramírez

Once Municipal
  Juan Camilo Mejía
  Lucas Marcal 
  Glauber Da Silva
  Daniel Cruz

Santa Tecla F.C.
  Carlos Escudero
  Lucas Rocco
  Facundo Nicolás Simioli

UES
  Gustavo Peña
  Allan Duarte

References

External links
 http://www.primerafutboles.com/
 http://www.elgrafico.com/
 http://www.elsalvadorfc.com/
 http://www.culebritamacheteada.com.sv/
 http://www.elsalvadorfutbol.com/

Primera División de Fútbol Profesional Apertura seasons
El
1